Haydn is both a surname and a given name. Notable people with the name include:

Surname
 Joseph Haydn (1732–1809), Austrian composer of the Classical period
 Johann Evangelist Haydn (1743–1805), tenor singer and brother of Joseph Haydn
 Joseph Timothy Haydn (d. 1856), Irish author of Haydn's Dictionary of Dates and The Book of Dignities
 Lili Haydn (born 1969), American actress, singer, and violinist
 Michael Haydn (1737–1806), composer and the younger brother of Joseph Haydn

Given name
 Haydn Bunton Sr. (1911–1955), Australian rules footballer
 Haydn Bunton Jr. (born 1937), Australian rules footballer
 Haydn Fleming (born 1978), English footballer
 Haydn Gwynne, British actress
 Haydn Linsley (born 1993), member of New Zealand boyband Titanium
 Haydn Tanner (1917–2009), Welsh rugby union player who also played for the British and Irish Lions
 Haydn Wood (1882–1959), 20th-century English composer and a respected violinist

See also
Hayden (given name)
Hayden (surname)